Settler colonialism is a type of colonialism in which foreign settlers move to and permanently reside on land already inhabited by Indigenous residents, with the goal of eliminating them and their cultures and replacing them with a settler society.
Some, but not all, scholars argue that settler colonialism is inherently genocidal. It may be enacted by a variety of means, ranging from violent depopulation of the previous inhabitants to less deadly means, such as assimilation or recognition of Indigenous identity within a colonial framework.

As with all forms of colonialism, it is based on exogenous domination, typically organized or supported by an imperial authority.  Settler colonialism contrasts with exploitation colonialism, which entails a economic policy of conquering territory to exploit its population as cheap or free labor and its natural resources as raw material. In this way, settler colonialism lasts indefinitely, except in the rare event of complete evacuation or settler decolonization. Political theorist Mahmoud Mamdani suggested that settlers could never succeed in their effort to become native, and therefore the only way to end settler colonialism was to erase the political significance of the settler–native dichotomy.

During the 1960s, settlement and colonization were perceived as separate phenomena from colonialism. Settlement endeavors were seen as taking place in empty areas, downplaying the Indigenous inhabitants. Later on in the 1970s and 1980s, settler colonialism was seen as bringing high living standards in contrast to the failed political systems associated with classical colonialism. Beginning in the mid-1990s, the field of settler colonial studies was established distinct but connected to Indigenous studies. Patrick Wolfe theorized settler colonialism as a structure (rather than an event) premised on the elimination rather than exploitation of the native population, thus distinguishing it from classical colonialism. Wolfe also argued that settler colonialism was centered on the control of land and that it continued after the closing of the frontier. His approach was defining for the field, but has been challenged by other scholars on the basis that many situations involve a combination of elimination and exploitation.

Settler colonial studies has often focused on British colonies in North America, Australia and New Zealand, which are close to the complete, prototypical form of settler colonialism, but is also applied to other cases including Kashmir, the Canary Islands, Latin America, Liberia, South Africa, Rhodesia, French Algeria, British Kenya, Italian Libya and East Africa, Ireland, Hokkaido, Korea, Manchukuo, German South West Africa, Posen and West Prussia, Generalplan Ost and Israel/Palestine.

In early modern and modern history 
During the early modern period, some European nation-states and their agents adopted policies of colonialism, competing with each other to establish colonies outside of Europe, at first in Macaronesia, then the Americas, and later in Asia, Africa, and Oceania.

Africa

Algeria

Kenya

Namibia

South Africa 

In 1652, the arrival of Europeans sparked the beginning of settler colonialism in South Africa. The Dutch East India Company was set up at the Cape, and imported large numbers of slaves from Africa and Asia during the mid-seventeenth century. The Dutch East India Company established a refreshment station for ships sailing between Europe and the east. The initial plan by Dutch East India Company officer Jan van Riebeeck was to maintain a small community around the new fort, but the community continued to spread and colonize further than originally planned. There was a historic struggle to achieve the intended British sovereignty that was achieved in other parts of the Commonwealth. State sovereignty belonged to the Union of South Africa (1910–61), followed by the Republic of South Africa (1961–1994) and finally the modern day Republic of South Africa (1994–Present day). As of 2014, the South African government has re-opened the period for land claims under the Restitution of Land Rights Amendment Act.

Western Sahara

Americas 

European colonization of the Americas began as early as the 10th century, when Norse sailors explored and settled limited areas on the shores of present-day Greenland and Canada. According to Norse folklore, violent conflicts with the Indigenous population ultimately made the Norse abandon those settlements.

Extensive European colonization began in 1492, when a Spanish expedition headed by Genoese Christopher Columbus sailed west attempting to find a new trade route to the Far East, but inadvertently landed in the Americas. European conquest, large-scale exploration, colonization and industrial development soon followed. Columbus's first two voyages (1492–93) reached the Bahamas and various Caribbean islands, including Hispaniola, Puerto Rico and Cuba. 

As the sponsor of Christopher Columbus's voyages, Spain was the first European power to settle and colonize the largest areas; and as a result of the Treaty of Tordesillas of 1494, Spain claimed dominion over everything west of a meridian 370 leagues west of Cabo Verde. Unbeknownst at the time, this included all of North and South America, except eastern present-day Greenland, and the easternmost tip of what is today Brazil. 

Before long, several western european empires began colonizing the so-called New World far from the Caribbean, Spain's initial focus. In 1497, the year before Columbus's third voyage reached the South American coast, John Cabot landed on the northeast North American coast, sailing from Bristol on behalf of England. Based on the terms defined in the Treaty of Tordesillas, the Portuguese Crown claimed it had territorial rights in the aforementioned area visited by John Cabot. As a result, in 1499 and 1500, Portuguese mariner João Fernandes Lavrador visited Greenland and the northeast coast of North America, naming Labrador in the process, and in 1501 and 1502, the Corte-Real brothers explored and charted Greenland, as well as what is today the Canadian province of Newfoundland and Labrador, claiming these lands as part of the Portuguese Empire. 

The Portuguese Empire also began exploring and colonizing present-day Brazil, Uruguay, and Argentina at this time. The first settler colony in what is today Brazil, São Vicente, was founded in 1532 by Martim Afonso de Sousa, although temporary trading posts had been established earlier to collect brazilwood, used as a dye. In 1534, Francis I of France sent Jacques Cartier on the first of three voyages to explore the coast of Newfoundland and the St. Lawrence River. This was the beginning of a dramatic territorial expansion for several European countries. Europe had been preoccupied with internal wars, and was only slowly recovering from the loss of population caused by the bubonic plague; thus the rapid rate at which it grew in wealth and power was unforeseeable in the early 15th century.

Several modern cities founded as Spanish colonies were established in the late 15th century and early 16th century, including Santo Domingo, the capital of the Dominican Republic, which was founded as early as 1496; Nombre de Dios, the oldest continuously inhabited European settlement in Panama, founded in 1510; Baracoa, the oldest continuously inhabited European settlement in—and former capital of—Cuba; Veracruz, the oldest continuously inhabited European settlement in Mexico, and Panama City, the first European city on the Pacific Coast of the Americas—both founded in 1519. The oldest continuously inhabited European settlement in Puerto Rico, and in the United States is San Juan, which was founded in 1521. San Juan is also the oldest continuously inhabited state or territorial capital in the United States, nearly a century older than Santa Fe, New Mexico, the oldest continuously inhabited state or territorial capital in the continental United States, founded in 1610. St. Augustine, Florida is the oldest continuously inhabited European settlement in the continental United States, having been founded in 1565.

Eventually, nearly the entire Western Hemisphere came under the ostensible control of European governments, leading to profound changes to its landscape, population, and plant and animal life. In the 19th century alone over 50 million people left Europe for the Americas. The post-1492 era is known as the period of the Columbian Exchange, a widespread exchange of animals, plants, culture, human populations (including forced laborers, free laborers, and indentured laborers), communicable disease, and ideas between the Americas and Afro-Eurasia following Columbus's voyages to the Americas.

Settler colonialism in the United States 

In the context of the United States, early colonial powers generally respected the territorial and political sovereignty of the Indigenous tribes, due to the need to forge local alliances with these tribes against other European colonial powers (i.e. British attempts to check French influence, etc.). The Euro-American colonial powers created economic dependency and imbalance of trade, incorporating Indigenous nations into spheres of influence and controlling them indirectly with the use of Christian missionaries and alcohol. However, with the emergence of an independent United States, desire for land and the perceived threat of permanent Indigenous political and spatial structures led to violent relocation of many Indigenous tribes to the American West, including the notable example of the Cherokee in what is known as the Trail of Tears. Frederick Jackson Turner, the father of the "frontier thesis" of American history, noted in 1901: "Our colonial system did not start with Spanish War; the U.S. had had a colonial history from the beginning...hidden under the phraseology of 'interstate migration' and territorial organization'". While the United States government and local state governments directly aided this dispossession through the use of military forces, ultimately this came about through agitation by settler society in order to gain access to Indigenous land. Especially in the US South, such land acquisition built plantation society and expanded the practice of slavery. Settler colonialism participated in the formation of US cultures and lasted past the conquest, removal, or extermination of Indigenous people. The practice of writing the Indigenous out of history perpetrated a forgetting of the full dimensions and significance of colonialism at both the national and local levels.

This forcible relocation of tribes came about in part through the mentality of Manifest Destiny, the mentality that it was the right and destiny of the United States to expand its territory and its rule across the North American continent, to the Pacific coast. Through various armed conflicts between Indigenous tribes on one side, with settler society backed by American military power on the other side, along with an increasing number of treaties centering around land cessation, Native American tribes were slowly pushed onto a system of reservations, where they traded territory for protection and support from the United States government. However, this system could be disadvantageous for tribes, as they often were forced to relocate to reservations far from their traditional homelands, or had trouble obtaining goods and annuity payments that were promised by the government, leading to further armed revolts and conflicts such as the Dakota War of 1862 in Minnesota. Cases of genocide that were carried out as policy include the Jacksonian era of forced removal and the California gold rush in Northern California. An example from 1873, General William T. Sherman wrote, "We must act with vindictive earnestness against the Sioux, even to their extermination, men, women, and children..."

Following the conclusion of U.S./Native American conflicts in the late 1800s, displacement of Indigenous peoples and identities switched to a more legal basis. Attempts were made to assimilate them into American society while stripping away territory; legislation like the Dawes Act of 1887 led to the division of previously communally held Indigenous lands into individually owned pieces of land that were to be held by tribal members. While 'allotment' was as mentioned held up as a way to help Indigenous people become 'civilized' and further assimilated into settler society, other motives included the erosion of tribal culture and social unity, along with allowing for more land for European-American settlement and economic ventures to make use of Indigenous lands. In the educational sphere, a system of boarding schools for Native children (Col. Richard Pratt's Carlisle School being a notable example) worked to strip Indigenous languages, religions and cultures away from children in order for them to better assimilate into American culture, in schools that were often geographically distant from their home communities.

Further developments such as the Federal policies of termination and relocation in the 1950s and 1960s reinforced the aims of settler society to eliminate Indigenous identity and occupation of space, through the disestablishment of Federal treaty/trust obligations to tribes, the transfer of civil and criminal jurisdiction over many reservations to the individual states, and the encouragement of Native Americans to leave their reservations and relocate to cities such as New York City, Minneapolis, Denver and Portland; it was hoped that this relocation would further erode tribal identity and speed up the process of assimilation.  In the wake of the 1950s termination and relocation policies, a pan-Indigenous movement arose in tandem to the African American civil rights movement and broad-based social justice and antiwar movements of 1960s. While both policies were officially (in the case of termination) and unofficially (relocation) ended by the early 1970s, they had the effect of creating a large population of Native American urban populations, and the unintended side effect of giving rise to increased political awareness among Native Americans, leading to the creation of organizations such as the American Indian Movement.

In the present day, the legacy of settler colonialism in the United States has created a complicated relationship between Indigenous tribes and the United States, especially in the area of treaty rights and sovereignty. Much contemporary literature written by Indigenous scholars and scholars within the field of American Indian Studies/Native Studies centers around recognizing the disruptive effects that settler colonialism has had on Native American tribes, including land loss, destruction of tribal languages and cultures, and tribal efforts to maintain recognition of rights they have gained via treaties with the United States government.  Anishinaabe (Ojibwe) historian Jean O'Brien names the practice of writing Indians out of existence "firsting and lasting". The national narrative tells of the "last" Indians or last tribes as well as the story of "first" settlement: the founder(s), the first school, first everything and the "last of Mohicans", "Ishi, the last Indian", and End of the Trail (sculpture by James Earle Fraser). Elizabeth Cook-Lynn defines the effects of "American colonialism" within towns that sit outside of the Navajo Nation's boundaries. Indigenous scholars, including Linda Tuhiwai Smith, have developed methodologies of Indigenous decolonization that center Indigenous knowledge and cultural practices.

Asia

China 

In the nineteenth-century period known as the Chuang Guandong, "Crashing into Guandong/Manchuria", the ethnically Manchu rulers of Qing dynasty China allowed rapid settlement by the ethnic-majority Han Chinese of the historical homeland of the Manchu and other Tungusic peoples in Northeast China, which had previously been strictly controlled and closed to habitation by most non-Indigenous Chinese.

Near the end of their rule the Qing tried to colonize Xinjiang along with other parts of the imperial frontier. To accomplish this goal they began a policy of settler colonialism by which Han Chinese were resettled on the frontier. This policy was renewed under the Xi Jinping Administration, led by General Secretary of the Chinese Communist Party Xi Jinping.

Ancient Chinese texts state that General Ran Min ordered the extermination of the Wu Hu, especially the Jie people, during the Wei–Jie war in the fourth century CE. The Jie were an ethnic group which possessed racial characteristics which included high-bridged noses and bushy beards, and as a result, they were easily identified and killed. In total, 200,000 of them were reportedly massacred.

Indonesia

Japan 

The island of Hokkaido was inhabited by the Indigenous Ainu people until the Japanese invasion and annexation of the island in the 19th century and Japanese mass migration.

Russia and the Soviet Union 

In the 19th century, the Russian Empire adopted the policy of Russification of areas in Asia and the Caucasus. In the case of the Circassian genocide, the local Circassian population was exterminated and replaced by Russian Cossack settlements. Between 1800 and 1914, 5.5 million European Russians and other Slavs moved to Siberia and the Far East, outnumbering the local Asian populace, except in Yakutia and Kamchatka, were they stayed in a minority. 

This colonization continued even during the Soviet Union in the 20th century. In the instance of Baltic states, after their Soviet occupation the Soviet rule developed into a colonial rule gradually. Around 700,000 immigrants, mostly Russians, settled in Latvia, changing the share of Latvians from 84% in 1945 to 52% in 1989. Almost 180,000 Russians settled in Estonia, changing the share of Estonians from 94% in 1945 to 62% in 1989. Similar colonizations occurred elsewhere. Between 1926 and 1959, the number of migrants rose from 57% to 80% in Buryatia, and from 36% to 53% in Yakutia. By 1959, Russians made up 75% of all migrants in Buryatia; 44% of migrants in Yakutia; and 76% of migrants in Khakassia. Soviet state documents show that the goals of the gulag included colonization of sparsely populated remote areas and exploiting its resources using forced labor. In 1929, OGPU was given the task to colonize these areas. To this end, the notion of "free settlement" was introduced. On 12 April 1930 Genrikh Yagoda wrote to the OGPU Commission:

 The Soviet policy also sometimes included the deportation of the native population, as in the case of the Kalmyks, the Karachays. and the Crimean Tatars. After the dissolution of the USSR, a decolonization process started in the Baltic states and Central Asia.

Europe

Canary Islands 

During the fifteenth century, the Kingdom of Castile sponsored expeditions by conquistadors to subjugate under Castilian rule the Macaronesian archipelago of the Canary Islands, located off the coast of Morocco and inhabited by the Indigenous Guanche people. Beginning with the start of the conquest of the island of Lanzarote on 1 May 1402 and ending with the surrender of the last Guanche resistance on Tenerife on 29 September 1496 to the now-unified Spanish crown, the archipelago was subject to a settler colonial process involving systematic enslavement, mass murder, and deportation of the Guanches, who were replaced with Spanish settlers, in a process foreshadowing the Iberian colonisation of the Americas that followed shortly thereafter. Also like in the Americas, Spanish colonialists in the Canaries quickly turned to the importation of slaves from mainland Africa as a source of labour due to the decimation of the already small Guanche population by a combination of war, disease, and brutal forced labour. Historian Mohamed Adhikari has labelled the conquest of the Canary Islands as the first overseas European settler colonial genocide.

Ireland

Nazi Germany

Middle East

Ba'athist Iraq 

For decades, Saddam Hussein 'Arabized' northern Iraq, an act often referred as "internal colonialism". The policy of Saddam Hussein in North Iraq during the Ba'athist rule was described by Dr. Francis Kofi Abiew as a "Colonial 'Arabization'" program, including large-scale Kurdish deportations and forced Arab settlement in the region.

Northern Cyprus 

Following the 1974 Turkish invasion of Cyprus, the Parliamentary Assembly of the Council of Europe stated that the demographics of the island are continuously modified as a result of the deliberate policies of the Turks. Some suggest that over 120,000 Turkish settlers were brought to the island from mainland Turkey, in violation of article 49 of the Geneva convention. 
According to the UN resolution 1987/19, adopted on 2 September 1987, the UN expressed "its concern also at the policy and practice of the implantation of settlers in the occupied territories of Cyprus, which constitute a form of colonialism and attempt to change illegally the demographic structure of Cyprus".

Nakhchivan and Nagorno-Karabakh

Palestine, Zionism and Israel 

According to Ilan Pappe, the Zionist movement leaders were publicly talking of a compulsory transfer of the Arab population in Mandatory Palestine since the 1930s; David Ben-Gurion wrote to the Jewish Agency Executive in June 1938  “...I support compulsory transfer. I don’t see anything immoral in it.” The first major wave of depopulation of Palestinian Arabs happened during the 1947–1949 Palestine war, when 700,000 Palestinians were led to leave their villages and towns in today's Israel. Historians such as Ilan Pappe and Benny Morris, who analysed unclassified IDF archives, concluded that the major reasons behind the Palestinians exodus were expulsion, intimidation, and fear of massacres and rape.

In 1967, the French historian Maxime Rodinson wrote an article later translated and published in English as Israel: A Colonial Settler-State? Lorenzo Veracini describes Israel as a colonial state and writes that Jewish settlers could expel the British in 1948 only because they had their own colonial relationships inside and outside Israel's new borders. Veracini believes the possibility of an Israeli disengagement is always latent and this relationship could be severed, through an "accommodation of a Palestinian Israeli autonomy within the institutions of the Israeli state". Other commentators, such as Daiva Stasiulis, Nira Yuval-Davis, and Joseph Massad in the "Post Colonial Colony: time, space and bodies in Palestine/ Israel in the persistence of the Palestinian Question" have included Israel in their global analysis of settler societies. Ilan Pappé describes Zionism and Israel in similar terms. Scholar Amal Jamal, from Tel Aviv University, has stated, "Israel was created by a settler-colonial movement of Jewish immigrants".

Some Palestinians express similar opinions - writer and sociologist Jamil Hilal, member of the Palestinian National Council, describes the place he lives in as "the heavily-colonised West Bank", and draws parallels between South African and Israeli settler colonialism: "as in Southern Africa, stretches of land were acquired by the Zionist settlers [...] and their Arab tenants thrown out". Former Palestinian Foreign Minister Dr. Nasser al-Qidwa opposes the policy of Israeli settlements and has described those efforts as colonialism.

According to a report by the FMEP issued in 2000, the settler population in the West Bank and Gaza strip grew from approximately 1,500 in 1972 to approximately 73,000 in 1989, and more than doubled that in 1998 to approximately 169,000. The report also describes demographic statistics indicating that, by place of birth, 78% of Israeli settlers in the West Bank and Gaza were from Europe or North America, 17% from Israel. The report did not include detailed statistics on Israeli settlements in East Jerusalem but estimated the settler population there to be around 200,000. In 2005, Israel withdrew from the Gaza Strip, dismantling all their settlements there and forcibly removing those settlers who refused to leave on their own. In January 2015 the Israeli Interior Ministry gave figures of 389,250 Israelis living in the West Bank and a further 375,000 Israelis living in East Jerusalem.

The portrayal of Zionism as a settler colonial movement is perceived by some scholars and commentators, as well as many Israeli Jews, as either an attack on the legitimacy of Israel or a form of antisemitism. Moses Lissak asserted that the settler-colonial thesis denies the idea that Zionism is the modern national movement of the Jewish people, seeking to reestablish a Jewish political entity in their historical territory. Zionism, Lissak argues, was both a national movement and a settlement movement at the same time, so it was not, by definition, colonial settlement movement. Some scholars and commentators, such as Judea Pearl, David Hirsh and Stephen H. Norwood, have described the settler-colonial thesis as a selective form of anti-Zionist propaganda, promoted by BDS and extreme left-wing groups. Israeli scholar S. Ilan Troen, in 'De-Judaizing the Homeland: Academic Politics in Rewriting the History of Palestine', argues that Zionism was the repatriation of a long displaced Indigenous population to their historic homeland, and that Zionism does not fit the framework of a settler society as  it "was not part of the process of imperial expansion in search of power and markets." Troen further argues that there are several differences between European colonialism and the Zionist movement, including that "there is no New Vilna, New Bialystock, New Warsaw, New England, New York,...and so on" in Israel.

Law professors S­teven Lubet and Jo­nathan Zasloff descr­ibe the "Zionism as settler colonialism" theory as political­ly motivated, deroga­tory and highly cont­roversial. According to them, there are important differences between Zionism and settler colonialism, for instance: (1) Early Zionists did not seek to transpo­rt European culture into Israel, they sought to revive the culture of an Indige­nous people of the land, the culture of their ancestors (e.g. they left their Eu­ropean languages beh­ind and adopted a Middle Eastern\Semit­ic one: Hebrew); (2) No settler colonial movement ever claimed to be "returning hom­e"; (3) Jews had alr­eady been living in the "colonized" region for thousands of years. Both profes­sors also point out that the academic journal where Wolfe published his essay fails to ment­ion the Islamic military campaign that captured the region in the 7th and 8th centuries.

Oceania

Australia

Europeans explored and settled Australia, displacing Aboriginal and Torres Strait Islander peoples. The Indigenous Australian population was estimated at about 795,000 at the time of European settlement. The population declined steeply for 150 years following settlement from 1788, due to casualties from the Australian frontier wars, infectious disease including the use of disease as biological warfare, and forced re-settlement and cultural disintegration.

New Caledonia 
The Caldoche are the descendants of European—in the majority French—settlers in New Caledonia, who often displaced the Indigenous Kanak population from the mid-19th century onwards.

New Zealand 

New Zealand's European population is the result of migration by Europeans since the beginning of the 19th century. The Indigenous Māori population are a significant minority population in the 21st century. The Maori Language Act accords official status to the Māori language. The Treaty of Waitangi is a document of central importance to the history and political constitution of the state of New Zealand, and is widely regarded as the founding document of New Zealand.

See also

References

Further reading 
 
 
 Horne, Gerald. The Apocalypse of Settler Colonialism: The Roots of Slavery, White Supremacy, and Capitalism in Seventeenth-Century North America and the Caribbean. Monthly Review Press, 2018. 243p. ISBN: 9781583676639
 Horne, Gerald. The Dawning of the Apocalypse: The Roots of Slavery, White Supremacy, Settler Colonialism, and Capitalism in the Long Sixteenth Century. Monthly Review Press, 2020. ISBN 978-1-58367-871-4.
 Marx, Christoph (2017). Settler Colonies, EGO - European History Online, Mainz: Institute of European History, retrieved: March 17, 2021 (pdf).
 Mikdashi, Maya (2013). What is settler colonialism? American Indian Culture and Research Journal 37.2: 23–34.
Settler Colonialism in the Twentieth Century (edited by Susan Pedersen and Caroline Elkins, Routledge, 2005.
 
 Wolfe, Patrick, 'Traces of History: Elementary Structures of Race' (Verso 2016)

External links 
 Articles on Settler Colonialism in Western American Literature

Settler colonialism
Cultural geography
Colonialism